Canada Without Poverty (CWP) is a not-for-profit organization dedicated to eradicating poverty in Canada and educating Canadians about the link between poverty and human rights.  It is based in Ottawa, with a second office in Vancouver and is run by a board of directors who have, or have had, personal experiences of poverty. Canada has yet to develop consistent poverty indicators, which makes it difficult to effectively help the estimated 1 in 7 or 4.8 million people living in conditions of poverty.  This is what CWP is working to change.

Origins 

CWP was founded in 1971 as a registered charity. It was an outgrowth of the Poor People's Conference which took place in Toronto in 1971, organized by the National Council of Welfare (NCW), under the auspices of the Canadian Minister of National Health and Welfare. The original name of the organization was the National Anti-Poverty Organization (NAPO). This name was changed to Canada Without Poverty (CWP) in 2009.  It has had partnerships with the Red Tents Campaign, Dignity for All: the campaign for a poverty-free Canada, Voices –Voix, and the  BC Poverty Reduction Coalition. 
 
The charity, from the beginning, was organized to become a main umbrella of nationwide anti-poverty activists; its mandate is identify the causes of poverty and to promote poverty eradication and human rights. Beginning in 1973, NAPO presented its first research document on hunger and food costs to the Federal Parliament. It continued, from this first campaign, to address poverty-related issues whether advocating for better health care, higher unemployment insurance benefits, fairer taxation, family benefits, recognition of homelessness and women's poverty, and/or the fundamental human rights of people living in poverty. It has acted as liaison between community groups and the Parliament in power.

In the 1990s NAPO began to expand its forums to regional and international discussions about poverty eradication, including concerns about homelessness, women's poverty issues, wage inequality and the growing attack on the poor, the result of neoliberal shifts towards the downsizing of government and dismantling of social programs.  From addressing the UN as an NGO  to co-hosting conferences at the regional and international level, NAPO not only increased its presence but drew powerful connections between reality of poverty in Canada and growing poverty as a result of globalization.

In the 1993 it convened a second Poor People's Conference and co-hosted a UN Poverty Roundtable in 1998 to deal with poverty in the Americas. In the 2000s it published  documents including Voices: Women, Poverty and Homelessness in Canada, a study of female homelessness in Canada, and began a national campaign for a new minimum wage. It also championed the rights of homeless people and won a legal case against the City of Winnipeg which was forced to repeal a by-law prohibiting panhandling.

Mission 
The mission of CWP is to relieve poverty in Canada by educating Canadians about the human and financial cost of poverty and by identifying public policy solutions. These 'costs' include financial and 'human'. CWP works with people from government, business and community groups to influence legislative priorities at the federal level regarding income and social support needs. CWP uses a human rights framework which states that all Canadians have a right to equality and dignity and expects social institutions  to uphold the values of caring, responsibility, and accountability based on UN concepts of fundamental human rights.
Louise Arbour, Chief Prosecutor at the Hague International War Tribunals and an Honorary Director of CWP, has stated "poverty prevails as the gravest human rights challenge in the world". 
In Canada, inequalities of access to social and economic resources contribute significantly to poverty levels across Canada, i.e., those in poverty are often First Nation people, immigrants and refugees, single adults between the ages of 45–64, and single mothers with children, disabled, those in the lowest-paying jobs, full or part-time. People in poverty in Canada more often access food banks, are often homeless, or in low-cost, sub-standard housing; they are part of the 'working poor' who rely on low wages, or are stuck in the poverty trap of welfare, and face hunger.

Current activities and impacts/successes 

In 2006 the Federal Government cut the funding to CWP. This seriously impeded their work. Other anti-poverty groups also experienced funding cuts. The Canadian Council for International Co-operation, a group involved in global poverty reduction and connected to CWP, is threatened with complete funding cuts. However, the organization has refused to simply stop operating. In 2009, Canada Without Poverty adopted a new logo that "symbolizes rising above one's poverty line towards a bright future".

The need for greater pressure is evident in the erosion of concern of the Federal government to address poverty.
Poverty deeply impacts individuals, families, society and costs governments perhaps as much as $80 billion annually. Individually it is characterized by people having to make tough choices between meeting basic needs like deciding whether to eat, buy new shoes, pay the rent etc. Studies have found poverty is strongly associated with poorer health,  physical and emotional, alcohol and drug abuse, recidivism in the criminal justice system, class divides that threaten Canadian social stability, and higher early mortality rates among those living in poverty.

Campaigns 

CWP is now involved in a number of significant, comprehensive campaigns including: "Dignity for All: The Campaign for a Poverty-Free Canada", a campaign that was co-founded in 2009 with Citizens for Public Justice. This campaign focuses on three fundamental "wants" in order to address the "structural causes of poverty in Canada" . These goals include the establishment of legislative changes to create an Act of Parliament which would ensure ongoing federal commitment and accountability mechanisms, the establishment of a federal poverty strategy, and adequate income supports for Canadians. This project is supported by over 550 Canadian anti-poverty groups (for example, Acorn Canada, and Alberta Human Rights Commission and almost 130 Members of Parliament and 15 Senators. The goal is to increase the number of groups and individuals committed to produce pressure on the government to act for Canadians demanding poverty eradication.

CWP was involved in writing Bill C-233, An Act to eliminate poverty in Canada (formerly Bill C-545). The original bill died on the floor in 2010, although it was reintroduced into Parliament by NDP MP Jean Crowder.

Organizational features 

Current and past CWP Board of Directors are primarily drawn from poverty activists, all of whom have lived in poverty themselves, either as children and/or as adults. In 2012 there were nine board members who lived in regions across the country.  All continued to work as activists representing various communities from First Nations to immigrants to urban and rural citizens.

In September 2012, Leilani Farha took the reins of the organization as its executive director. Leilani is a leading expert and advocate on economic and social human rights, especially for women.  She has a long history promoting the right to adequate housing, equality and non-discrimination in housing in Canada and internationally.  Prior to joining Canada Without Poverty, Leilani was the executive director of the Centre for Equality Rights in Accommodation for 12 years.  She has extensive experience addressing homelessness, poverty and inequality in Canada through advocacy, casework, litigation, research and community based work.  She has been at the forefront of applying international human rights law to anti-poverty issues in Canada, and is known internationally for her work on housing rights and women's economic and social rights. In June 2014, Leilani was appointed as the United Nations Special Rapporteur on Adequate Housing which she does in addition to her role as CWP Executive Director.

There is also an Honorary Board, made up of Canadian political leaders including former Federal NDP leader Ed Broadbent, former Prime Minister Joe Clark, former Member of Parliament Monique Bégin and former Canadian Supreme Court Justice Louise Arbour. The fifth Honorary Board member is Ovide Mercredi, a Cree who serves as the Chief of the Misipawistik Cree Nation. In February 2012, Elizabeth May, the Green Party of Canada leader joined an all-party panel discussion on poverty organized by the Dignity for All Campaign to ensure adequate discussion on issues relating to the low-income population remain on the public agenda.

In 2015 CWP employs four employees to fulfill all administrative affairs, including fund raising, communications, and organizing the various events and campaigns along with the assistance of numerous volunteers.

References

External links
 
pi.library.yorku.ca

Charities based in Canada